Li Shuaitai (d. 1666) was a military commander of the early Qing Dynasty. He served as the Viceroy of Liangguang between 1653 and 1656, then as the Viceroy of Minzhe from 1656 to its partition in 1658, after which he continued as Viceroy of Fujian until 1664. 

His father, Li Yongfang, was a Ming general who defected to the Qing.

References 
 

Grand Secretaries of the Qing dynasty
Viceroys of Liangguang
Viceroys of Min-Zhe
Qing dynasty politicians
Qing dynasty generals
1666 deaths
Han Chinese Plain Blue Bannermen